Boqrai (also Romanized as Boqrā’ī; also known as Boqrá) is a village in Zirkuh Rural District, Central District, Zirkuh County, South Khorasan Province, Iran. At the 2006 census, its population was 281, in 82 families.

References 

Populated places in Zirkuh County